Lynda Susan Weinman (born January 24, 1955) is an American business owner, computer instructor, and author, who founded an online software training website, lynda.com, with her husband, Bruce Heavin. Lynda.com was acquired by online business network LinkedIn in April 2015 for $1.5 billion.

Weinman, with self-taught computer skills, worked in the film industry as a special effects animator, and became a faculty member at Art Center College of Design, UCLA, American Film Institute, and San Francisco State University  multimedia studies program teaching computer graphics, animation, interactive design, and motion graphics. She has also written several books.

Education
Weinman graduated with a degree in humanities from The Evergreen State College in Olympia, Washington in 1976.

Career
A year after graduating, Weinman opened two retail stores, Vertigo on Melrose and Vertigo on Sunset in Los Angeles. They closed in 1982.

Weinman worked for Dreamquest and as an independent contractor doing animation and special effects. She worked on several films, including RoboCop 2 (1990), Bill & Ted's Excellent Adventure (1989), and Star Trek V: The Final Frontier (1989).

Weinman attributes her initial interest in computers to her having taught herself how to use an Apple II. She acquired these skills by reading the manual.

Weinman taught digital media and motion graphics at Art Center College of Design in Pasadena, California from 1989 to 1996. Her book designing web graphics, published by New Riders in 1995, often is credited with being the first title to discuss web authoring technologies from a visual design perspective.

Weinman was co-founder with her husband, Bruce Heavin, of the Ojai Digital Arts Center  in Ojai, California in 1999.

Lynda.com

The Lynda.com Online Training Library taught computer skills in video format to members through monthly and annual subscription-based plans. The company was founded in Ojai, California and has since moved to Ventura and Carpinteria, California, where, as of 2013, it employed nearly 500 full-time staff members and more than 140 teachers who earn royalties from their shared revenue model. The company website was created in 1995 and the company was incorporated in 1997.

Lynda.com evolved from its original conception as a free web resource for Lynda's students, to the site for her books on web design, to the registration hub for physical classrooms and conferences, to an online virtual knowledge library, where members could watch software and technology courses in several categories (3D and animation, audio, business, design, development, home computing, photography, video, and web and interactive design). The company also produced documentaries about creative professionals.

The company received $103 million in venture capital funding in January 2013, led by Accel Partners and Spectrum Equity. On January 14, 2015, lynda.com announced it had raised $186 million in financing, led by investment group TPG Capital.

The company since acquired the companies video2brain, an Austrian-based provider of online classes in web design and programming, available in German, French, Spanish, and English languages, and Compilr, provider of an online editor and sandbox.

On April 7, 2015, LinkedIn acquired Lynda.com in a deal worth $1.5 billion. The sale was immediately followed by a 10% cut in company staff. During the next half year, layoffs continued as Lynda.com departments were folded into LinkedIn.

Flashforward conferences
Lynda.com and United Digital Artists Productions, Inc. (UAD) co-founded the Flashforward Conferences and the Flash Film Festival, which first took place in 1999. The Flashforward Conference, the first event focused on Macromedia Flash, held fourteen events in San Francisco, New York, London, and Amsterdam, serving more than 20,000 attendees over six years. The Flash Film Festival presented more than 200 awards to Flash sites and applications, to winners from more than 30 countries. The last scheduled conference took place in August 2008.

Works
Weinman has authored or co-authored sixteen books as well as numerous magazine articles.

Books

Magazine articles
 Web; Better Web Graphics with Transparency. Macworld, October 1998
 A Web graphics primer. Macworld, May 1998
 Tile your site: use tiles to create the layered look on your Web pages. Macworld, May 1998
 Preparing Web graphics. Macworld, August 1996
 Lynda Weinman on What's Next for Flash in 2006. PeachPit, January 6, 2006.
 Web Design Tips: Making Site Comps and Prototypes. CreativePro.com, August 13, 2003.

Awards
 Art Center College of Design Great Teacher Award, 1997
 San Francisco Women on the Web Top 25 Women, 1999
 GirlGeeks Golden Horn-Rims Award recipient, 2000,
 First Hollywood Film Festival's Discovery CyberAwards Nominee, 10.14.1997.
 Entrepreneur of the Year finalist, Ernst & Young Entrepreneur Of The Year 2010 Regional Awards.
 Entrepreneur of the Year, South Coast Business and Technology Awards
 2011 Women of Achievement Award, Association for Women in Communications, Santa Barbara chapter (AWC-SB)

Boards
 Santa Barbara International Film Festival
 Lotusland
 AIGA National Board Member, 2009- 
 Miller Freeman Web Design & Development Conferences
 "New Media Magazine"
 The Evergreen State College Foundation Board of Governors & Trustees, 2004-

Philanthropy
Weinman is the namesake and benefactor for the 'Lynda Lab', the Experimental Effects Lab in the Center for Creative and Applied Media (CCAM) at her alma mater, The Evergreen State College. The foundation has a pledge from Weinman and husband, Bruce Heavin, to establish an endowment supporting equipment in the CCAM. Weinman and Heavin also have contributed to scholarships at Art Center College of Design, as well as an ongoing endowment for additional scholarships.

References

External links 
 lynda.com - online software training company co-founded by Lynda Weinman. Provider of educational materials for individuals, businesses and schools, including the Online Training Library and CD- and DVD-based video training.
 FlashForward
 Hansel Minutes

American technology writers
Living people
Jewish American philanthropists
Web designers
Place of birth missing (living people)
1955 births
Evergreen State College alumni
Art Center College of Design faculty
LinkedIn people
21st-century American Jews